Plocucha was a genus of moths in the family Geometridae. It is now considered a synonym of Anisodes.

References

Sterrhinae